James Edward Chalmers (born 2 March 1978) is an Australian politician. He has been Treasurer of Australia in the Albanese government since May 2022. He is a member of the Australian Labor Party (ALP) and has served as a member of parliament for the division of Rankin since 2013.

Chalmers was born in Brisbane and attended the Australian National University, where he completed a doctorate in political science. At the 2013 Australian federal election, Chalmers won the seat of Rankin in Brisbane's south, entering the House of Representatives. He served in the shadow ministries of Bill Shorten and Anthony Albanese, before assuming the role of Treasurer after Labor's victory in the 2022 federal election.

Early life and education
Chalmers was born in Brisbane, the youngest of three children born to Graham and Carol Chalmers. His father worked as a courier and his mother worked as a nurse. They divorced when he was 14, by which time his older sisters had left home.

Chalmers grew up in Logan City in Brisbane's south. He attended Catholic schools before going on to Griffith University, where he completed the degrees of Bachelor of Arts and Bachelor of Communication. He went on to complete a PhD in political science at the Australian National University, writing his doctoral thesis on the prime ministership of Paul Keating, titled "Brawler statesman: Paul Keating and prime ministerial leadership in Australia".

Early political involvement
From 1999 to 2001, Chalmers worked under Queensland premier Peter Beattie as a research officer in the Department of Premier and Cabinet. He was the ALP's national research manager from 2002 to 2004, media adviser to Shadow Treasurer Wayne Swan from 2005 to 2006, deputy chief of staff to Opposition Leader Kim Beazley in 2006, and a senior adviser to New South Wales premier Morris Iemma from 2006 to 2007. After Labor won the 2007 federal election, Chalmers returned to work for Wayne Swan in the Department of the Treasury, as deputy chief of staff and principal adviser (2007–2010) and then as chief of staff (2010–2013). He briefly served as the executive director of the Chifley Research Centre in 2013. In the same year he published Glory Daze, a book about the disconnect between Australia's strong economic performance and popular discontent with government.

Member of Parliament

Opposition (2013–2022)

Chalmers was elected to parliament at the 2013 federal election, replacing the retiring ALP member Craig Emerson in the Division of Rankin. He defeated former MP Brett Raguse for Labor preselection. Chalmers was made a shadow parliamentary secretary in October 2013, a shadow minister in October 2015, and promoted to the shadow cabinet after the 2016 election as Shadow Minister for Finance.

After the 2019 federal election, Chalmers publicly considered running to succeed Bill Shorten as party leader and Leader of the Opposition. His relative youth and status as a Queenslander were seen as potential assets, as well as his membership of the Labor Right faction. However, some within his faction had already chosen to support the Labor Left candidate Anthony Albanese. Chalmers eventually chose not to stand for the position, allowing Albanese to become leader unopposed. He subsequently also ruled out standing for the deputy leadership. He was subsequently appointed Shadow Treasurer in Albanese's cabinet.

Albanese government (2022–present)
Labor was victorious in the 2022 Australian federal election, and two days later, Albanese had himself, Chalmers and three other senior Labor frontbenchers sworn in as an interim five-person government, with Chalmers becoming the Treasurer of Australia. He was also the interim Minister for Home Affairs until the full ministry was sworn in after the Quadrilateral Security Dialogue. In October 2022, Chalmers handed down his first budget.

Political positions
Chalmers is a member of the Labor Right faction. In 2016 he co-founded the Courtyard Group, a roundtable linking Labor MPs with "Australia's leading progressive thinkers from business, academia, media, and consumer advocacy bodies".

According to political scientist Carol Johnson, Chalmers' 2013 book Glory Daze "defined Labor as standing for intergenerational mobility, aspiration and the Fair Go, while emphasising the importance of sound economic management". His 2017 book Changing Jobs: The fair go in the new machine age, co-authored with telecommunications executive Mike Quigley, argued that future governments should consider a robot tax to reduce the impact of technological unemployment. He has also expressed positive views on the concept of a universal basic income. In the lead-up to the 2022 election, Chalmers stated that an ALP government would not increase taxes other than on multinational corporations. He also rejected new taxes. His campaigning focused on cost of living issues but also emphasised the need to work co-operatively with business.

In a long-form essay published in The Monthly in 2023, Chalmers argued for more active involvement by the government in capital markets to collaborate with enterprises that suit the government's social and environmental priorities, describing it as "values-based capitalism".

Personal life
In March 2013 Chalmers married Laura Anderson, a journalist and writer who worked as a staffer to Penny Wong and Julia Gillard. The couple have three children. Their wedding, attended by Gillard and Wayne Swan among others, occurred two days after an ALP leadership spill. While in attendance Gillard "convened a council of war in a specially set-aside room to frame a new ministry".

Chalmers identifies as a Catholic, though more "tribal than Bible", his three children having been baptised in the same church he was baptised. His interests have been listed to include running, rugby league and basketball.

Publications 

 Chalmers, Jim (2013) Glory Daze: How a world-beating nation got so down on itself, Melbourne University Press, ISBN 9780522864137
 Chalmers, Jim (2017) Changing Jobs, The Fair go in the New Machine Age (with M Quigley) Redback, ISBN 9781863959445

References

External links
 Summary of parliamentary voting for Jim Chalmers MP on TheyVoteForYou.org.au
 

1978 births
Living people
21st-century Australian politicians
Australian Labor Party members of the Parliament of Australia
Australian National University alumni
Griffith University alumni
Labor Right politicians
Members of the Cabinet of Australia
Government ministers of Australia
Members of the Australian House of Representatives
Members of the Australian House of Representatives for Rankin
Treasurers of Australia
Place of birth missing (living people)
Albanese Government